The Blue Bird is a 1970 Soviet animated feature film based upon the 1908 play by Maurice Maeterlinck. It was directed by Vasily Livanov and made at the Soyuzmultfilm studio.

The film is known for blending traditional and cutout styles of animation. Its music was composed by Gennady Gladkov and performed by the State Symphony Cinema Orchestra (under the direction of Vladimir Vasilyev); the Moscow state chorus; and the children's chorus, "Sputnik".

Plot
The film is set in a modern capitalist city. While searching for food at the market, a boy saves a stray dog from a cruel salesman. An old woman passing by witnesses the act and reveals that she is a fairy. She gives the boy a caged bluebird as a reward, stating that it can neither be sold nor bought, but can be given as a gift. He hides the bluebird in his attic, and plans to show it to his little sister.

At night, the brother and sister enter the attic to encounter their long-dead grandparents. The grandparents reveal that the bluebird has been stolen by a cat named Puss. They say that the bluebird contains happiness for all, so it must be rescued and set free. 

The children and the dog set out in search of the bluebird. They meet a rich man who wants to use the bluebird to start a war and conquer the world. The rich man tempts the children with various delicacies to make them forget about the bluebird, but the fairy helps them escape. 

The children make their way into the dark mines, where cheerful workers welcome them and offer gifts of bread. The fairy appears once more to provide the eternal companions of man: Fire, Water, and Bread. The group learns that Puss has kidnapped the bluebird at the behest of his mistress, Night, so that she can sell it to the rich man. Her plans are thwarted when Fire burns Night, Puss drowns in Water, and the boy steals the bird from the rich man.

After recovering the bluebird, the boy falls off a clock tower. Morning comes, and the boy wakes to discover that their journey was only a dream. He and his sister go to the attic and release the bluebird into the wild.

Crew

See also
History of Russian animation
List of animated feature-length films

References

External links
 The film at animator.ru
 

1970 animated films
1970 films
1970 in the Soviet Union
 Films based on works by Maurice Maeterlinck
 Films scored by Gennady Gladkov
1970s Russian-language films
 Soviet animated films
 Soviet films based on plays
Soyuzmultfilm
Works based on The Blue Bird (play)